Melissa Howard (born February/March 1989) is an Australian actress, best known for playing Rebecca Ainsworth in Dead Gorgeous.

Early life 
Howard was born in Brisbane. From 2002 to 2006 she attended Corinda State High School in Corinda. During this period, she joined the Screech Theatre Group, composed of disabled and non-disabled people. In 2008, she moved to Melbourne, in Albert Park, Victoria suburb, where she worked at Cafe Sienna and started studying Literature at the University of Melbourne.

Career 
In 2003, she studied acting at Film and Television Studio International in Melbourne and Brisbane. Three years later, she joined Zen Zen Zo Physical Theatre Company. In 2005, she acted in the romantic drama Advanced Screening, an example of cinematic theatre, written and directed by Brad Jennings.

Howard debuted on small screen in 2009, playing Chanel in three episodes of Rush. In 2010, she was a guest star in Satisfaction and had her first major role, that of Rebecca Ainsworth, one of the main characters in Dead Gorgeous. The following year, Howard had a cameo in the TV movie Underbelly Files: Infiltration, where she portraited a friend of Chelsea's. In 2012, she started filming her first theatrical movie, Animals, directed by Edward Drake and based on Where Were You, a short movie by the same director. In 2014, she was featured in the short film Black and White and in the play Below Babylon.

Filmography

Awards

References

External links 

Melissa Howard on Myspace

1989 births
Australian film actresses
Australian television actresses
Living people
Actresses from Brisbane
21st-century Australian actresses